Events in the year 1820 in Norway.

Incumbents
Monarch: Charles III John

Events

Arts and literature
The song Sønner av Norge is written by Henrik Anker Bjerregaard and Christian Blom.

Births
5 April – Josephine Thrane, teacher and political activist (d.1862).
18 June – Martin Andreas Udbye, composer and organist (d.1889)
12 August – Hans Henrik Wærenskjold, politician (d.1909)
27 December – Jens Amundsen, ship-owner (d.1886)

Full date unknown
Lars Kristiansen Blilie, politician (d.1892)
Erik Eriksen, ice sea captain (d.1888)
Jørgen Aall Flood, politician, vice consul and businessman (d.1892)

Deaths
5 May – Søren Georg Abel, priest and politician (b.1772)

See also

References